As an archaeological culture, the Mapuche people of southern Chile and Argentina have a long history which dates back to 600–500 BC. The Mapuche society underwent great transformations after Spanish contact in the mid–16th century. These changes included the adoption of Old World crops and animals and the onset of a rich Spanish–Mapuche trade in La Frontera and Valdivia. Despite these contacts Mapuche were never completely subjugated by the Spanish Empire. Between the 18th and 19th century Mapuche culture and people spread eastwards into the Pampas and the Patagonian plains. This vast new territory allowed Mapuche groups to control a substantial part of the salt and cattle trade in the Southern Cone.

Between 1861 and 1883 the Republic of Chile conducted a series of campaigns that ended Mapuche independence causing the death of thousands of Mapuche through combat, pillaging, starvation and smallpox epidemics. Argentina conducted similar campaigns on the eastern side of the Andes in the 1870s. In large parts of the Mapuche lands the traditional economy collapsed forcing thousands to seek themselves to the large cities and live in impoverished conditions as housemaids, hawkers or labourers.

From the late 20th century onwards Mapuche people have been increasingly active in conflicts over land rights and indigenous rights.

Pre-Columbian period

Origins

Archaeological finds have shown the existence of a Mapuche culture in Chile as early as 600 to 500 BC. Genetically Mapuches differ from the adjacent indigenous peoples of Patagonia. This is interpreted as suggesting either a "different origin or long lasting separation of Mapuche and Patagonian populations". A 1996 study comparing genetics of indigenous groups in Argentina found no significant link between Mapuches and other groups. A 2019 study on the human leukocyte antigen genetics of Mapuche from Cañete found affinities with a variety of North and South American indigenous groups. Notably the study found also affinities also with Aleuts, Eskimos, Pacific Islanders, Ainu from Japan, Negidals from Eastern Siberia and Rapa Nui from Easter Island.

There is no consensus on the linguistic affiliation of the Mapuche language, . In the early 1970s, significant linguistic affinities between Mapuche and Mayan languages were suggested. Linguist Mary Ritchie Key claimed in 1978 that Araucanian languages, including Mapuche, were genetically linked to the Pano-Tacanan languages, to the Chonan languages and the Kawéskar languages. Croese (1989, 1991) has advanced the hypothesis that Mapudungun is related to the Arawakan languages.

In 1954 Grete Mostny postulated the idea of a link between Mapuches and the archaeological culture of El Molle in the Transverse Valleys of Norte Chico. This idea was followed up by Patricio Bustamante in 2007. Mapuche communities in the southern Diaguita lands –that is Petorca, La Ligua, Combarbalá and Choapa – may be rooted in Pre-Hispanic times at least several centuries before the Spanish arrival. Mapuche toponymy is also found throughout the area. While there was an immigration of Mapuches to the southern Diaguita lands in colonial times Mapuche culture there is judged to be older than this.

Based on mDNA analysis of various indigenous groups of South America it is thought that Mapuche are at least in part descendant of peoples from the Amazon Basin that migrated to Chile through two routes; one through the Central Andean highlands and another through the eastern Bolivian lowlands and the Argentine Northwest.

A hypothesis put forward by Ricardo E. Latcham, and later expanded by Francisco Antonio Encina, theorizes that the Mapuche migrated to present-day Chile from the Pampas east of the Andes. The hypothesis further claims that previous to the Mapuche, there was a "Chincha-Diaguita" culture, which was geographically cut in half by the Mapuche penetrating from mountain passes around the head of the Cautín River. Albeit the Latcham hypothesis is consistent with linguistic features it is rejected by modern scholars due to the lack of conclusive evidence, and the possibility of alternative hypotheses.

Tomás Guevara has postulated another unproven hypothesis claiming that early Mapuches dwelled at the coast due to abundant marine resources and did only later moved inland following large rivers. Guevara adds that Mapuches would be descendants of northern Changos, a poorly known coastal people, who moved southwards. This hypothesis is supported by tenuous linguistic evidence linking a language of 19th century Changos (called Chilueno or Arauco) with Mapudungun.

According to a theory of historian Roberto E. Porcel the Mapuche were descendants of a group of Aymaras that migrated south as consequence of a conflict between Antisuyu and Contisuyu.

Tiwanaku and Puquina influence
It has been conjectured that the collapse of the Tiwanaku empire about 1000 CE caused a southward migratory wave leading to a series of changes in Mapuche society in Chile. Tom Dillehay and co-workers suggest that the decline of Tiwanaku would have led to the spread of agricultural techniques into Mapuche lands in south-central Chile. These techniques include the raised fields of Budi Lake and the canalized fields found in Lumaco Valley.

A cultural linkage of this sort may help explain parallels in mythological cosmologies among Mapuches and peoples of the Central Andes.

Possible Polynesian contact

In 2007, evidence appeared to have been found that suggested pre-Columbian contact between Polynesians from the western Pacific and the Mapuche people. Chicken bones found at the El Arenal site in the Arauco Peninsula, an area inhabited by Mapuche, support a pre-Columbian introduction of chicken to South America. The bones found in Chile were carbon-dated to between 1304 and 1424, before the arrival of the Spanish. Chicken DNA sequences taken were matched to those of chickens in present-day American Samoa and Tonga; they did not match the DNA of European chickens. However, a later report in the same journal, assessing the same mtDNA, concluded that the Chilean chicken specimen matches with the European/Indian subcontinental/Southeast Asian sequences. Thus, it may not support a Polynesian introduction of chickens to South America.

In December 2007, several human skulls with Polynesian features, such as rocker jaws and pentagonal shape when viewed from behind, were found lying on a shelf in a museum in Concepción.  These skulls turned out to have come from people of Mocha Island, an island just off the coast of Chile in the Pacific Ocean, today inhabited by Mapuche. Professor Lisa Matisoo-Smith of the University of Otago and José Miguel Ramírez Aliaga of the University of Valparaíso hope to win agreement soon with the locals of Mocha Island to begin an excavation to search for Polynesian remains on the island. Rocker jaws have also been found at an excavation led Ramírez in pre-Hispanic tombs and shell middens of the coastal locality of Tunquén, Central Chile.

According to Ramírez "more than a dozen Mapuche - Rapa Nui cognates have been described". Among these are the Mapuche words toki (axe), kuri (black) and piti (little).

The Mapuche clava hand club have striking similarities with the Maori wahaika.

Mapuche expansion into Chiloé Archipelago

A theory postulated by chronicler José Pérez García holds the Cunco settled in Chiloé Island in Pre-Hispanic times as consequence of a push from more northern Huilliche who in turn were being displaced by Mapuche.

Evidence for a Chono past of the southernmost Mapuche lands in Chiloé and the nearby mainland are various placenames with Chono etymologies despite the main indigenous language of the archipelago at the arrival of the Spanish being veliche (Mapuche). This is in line with notions of ethnologist Ricardo E. Latcham who consider the Chono along other sea-faring nomads may be remnants from more widespread indigenous groups that were pushed south by "successive invasions" from more northern tribes.

The Payos, an indigenous group in southern Chiloé encountered by the Spanish, may have been Chonos en route to acculturate into the Mapuche.

Inca expansion and influence

Troops of the Inca Empire are reported to have reached Maule River and had a battle with Mapuches from Maule River and Itata River there. The southern border of the Inca Empire is believed by most modern scholars to be situated between Santiago and the Maipo River or somewhere between Santiago and the Maule River. Spanish chroniclers Miguel de Olavarría and Diego de Rosales claimed the Inca frontier laid much further south at the Bío Bío River. While historian José Bengoa concludes that Inca troops apparently never crossed Bío Bío River, chronicler Diego de Rosales gives an account of the Incas crossing the river going south all the way to La Imperial and returning north through Tucapel along the coast.

The main settlements of the Inca Empire in Chile lay along the Aconcagua River, Mapocho River and the Maipo River. Quillota in Aconcagua Valley was likely their foremost settlement. As result of Inca rule there was some Mapudungun–Imperial Quechua bilingualism among Mapuches of Aconcagua Valley. Salas argue Mapuche, Quechua and Spanish coexisted with significant bilingualism in Central Chile (between Mapocho and Bío Bío) rivers during the 17th century.

As it appear to be the case in the other borders of the Inca Empire, the southern border was composed of several zones: first, an inner, fully incorporated zone with mitimaes protected by a line of pukaras (fortresses) and then an outer zone with Inca pukaras scattered among allied tribes. This outer zone would according to historian José Bengoa have been located between Maipo and Maule Rivers. 

Incan yanakuna are believed by archaeologists Tom Dillehay and Américo Gordon to have extracted gold south of the Incan frontier in free Mapuche territory. Following this thought the main motif for Incan expansion into Mapuche territory would have been to access gold mines. Same archaeologists do also claim all early Mapuche pottery at Valdivia is of Inca design. Inca influence can also be evidenced far south as Osorno Province (latitude 40–41° S) in the form of Quechua and Quechua–Aymara toponyms. Alternatively these toponyms originated in colonial times from the population of the Valdivian Fort System that served as a penal colony linked to the Peruvian port of El Callao.

Gold and silver bracelets and "sort of crowns" were used by Mapuches in the Concepción area at the time of the Spanish arrival as noted by Jerónimo de Vivar. This is interpreted either as Incan gifts, war spoils from defeated Incas, or adoption of Incan metallurgy.

Through their contact with Incan invaders Mapuches would have for the first time met people with state-level organization. Their contact with the Inca gave them a collective awareness distinguishing between them and the invaders and uniting them into loose geopolitical units despite their lack of state organization.

Mapuche society at the arrival of the Spanish

Demography and settlement types
At the time of the arrival of the first Spaniards to Chile the largest indigenous population concentration was in the area spanning from Itata River to Chiloé Archipelago—that is the Mapuche heartland. The Mapuche population between Itata River and Reloncaví Sound has been estimated at 705,000–900,000 in the mid-16th century by historian José Bengoa.

Mapuches lived in scattered hamlets, mainly along the great rivers of Southern Chile. All major population centres lay at the confluences of rivers. Mapuches preferred to build their houses on hilly terrain or isolated hills rather than on plains and terraces.

Mythology and religion

The machi (shaman), a role usually played by older women, is an extremely important part of the Mapuche culture. The  performs ceremonies for the warding off of evil, for rain, for the cure of diseases, and has an extensive knowledge of Chilean medicinal herbs, gained during an arduous apprenticeship. Chileans of all origins and classes make use of the many traditional herbs known to the Mapuche.

s were used in funerals and they are present in narratives about death in Mapuche religion.

Social organization
The politics, economy and religion of the pre- and early-contact Mapuches were based on the lineages of local communities called . This kind of organization was replicated at the larger rehue level that encompassed several . The politics of each lineage were not equally aggressive or submissive, but different from case to case. Lineages were patrilineal and patrilocal. Polygamy was common among Mapuches and together with the custom of feminine exogamy it has been credited by José Bengoa with welding the Mapuche into one people.

Early Mapuches had two types of leaders, secular and religious.

Economy
In South-Central Chile most Mapuche groups practised glade agriculture among the forests. Other agriculture types existed; while some Mapuches and Huilliches practised a slash-and-burn type of agriculture, some more labour-intensive agriculture is known to have been developed by Mapuches around Budi Lake (raised fields) and the Lumaco and Purén valleys (canalized fields). Potato was the staple food of most Mapuches, "specially in the southern and coastal [Mapuche] territories where maize did not reach maturity". The bulk of the Mapuche population worked in agriculture. Mapuches did also cultivate quinoa, but it is not known if the variety originated in Central Chile or in the Central Andes.

In addition the Mapuche and Huilliche economy was complemented with Araucana chicken and chilihueque raising and collection of Araucaria araucana and Gevuina avellana seeds. The southern coast was particularly rich in molluscs, algaes, crustaceans and fish and Mapuches were known to be good fishers. Hunting was also a common activity among Mapuches. The forests provided firewood, fibre and allowed the production of planks.

Mapuche territory had an effective system of roads before the Spanish arrival as evidenced by the fast advances of the Spanish conquerors.

Technology

Tools are known to have been relatively simple, most of them were made of wood, stone or — more rarely — of copper or bronze. Mapuche used a great variety of tools made of pierced stones. Volcanic scoria, a common rock in Southern Chile, was preferentially used to make tools, possibly because it is ease to shape. Mapuches used both individual digging sticks and large and heavy trident-like plows that required many men to use in agriculture. Another tool used in agriculture were maces used to destroy clods and flatten the soil.

The Mapuche canoes or wampus were made of hollow trunks. In the Chiloé Archipelago another type of watercraft was common: the dalca.  were made of planks and were mainly used for seafaring while wampus were used for navigating rivers and lakes. It is not known what kind of oars early Mapuches presumably used.

There are various reports in the 16th century of Mapuches using gold adornments. This tradition may be unrelated to Inca influence as the Mapuche word milla is unrelated those of the Andean languages. Gold was the most important metal in Pre-Hispanic Mapuche culture.

Early Hispanic period (1536–1598)

First contacts (1536–1550)
 
The Spanish expansion into Chile was an offshoot of the conquest of Peru. Diego de Almagro amassed a large expedition of about 500 Spaniards and thousands of yanaconas and arrived at the Aconcagua Valley in 1536. From there he sent Gómez de Alvarado south in charge of a scouting troop. Alvarado reached the Itata River where he engaged in the Battle of Reynogüelén with local Mapuches. Alvarado then returned north and Diego de Almagro's expedition returned to Peru since they had not found the riches they expected.

Another conquistador, Pedro de Valdivia, arrived in Chile from Cuzco in 1541 and founded Santiago that year. In 1544 captain Juan Bautista Pastene explored the coast of Chile to latitude 41° S. The northern Mapuche, better known as Promaucaes or Picunches, unsuccessfully tried to resist the Spanish conquest. Northern Mapuche groups appear to have responded to the Spanish conquest abandoning their best agricultural lands and moving to remote localities away from the Spanish. In this context one of the reasons the Spanish had to establish the city of La Serena in 1544 was to control Mapuche groups that had begun to migrate north following the Spanish founding of Santiago. The Spanish understood this abandonment as an attempt to have them leave Chile much in the way Diego de Almagro did in his failed expedition of 1535–1537. According to chronicler Francisco de Riberos northern Mapuche put cultivation on hold for more than five years. 17th century Jesuit Diego de Rosales wrote that this was a coordinated strategy that was decided by a large assembly of many tribes. The Spanish found themselves in great distress as a result of a lack of supplies, but ultimately this strategy was unsuccessful in forcing Spanish conquerors out of Central Chile.

War with Spaniards (1550–1598)

In 1550 Pedro de Valdivia, who aimed to control all of Chile to the Straits of Magellan, traveled southward to conquer Mapuche territory. Between 1550 and 1553 the Spanish founded several cities in Mapuche lands including Concepción, Valdivia, Imperial, Villarrica and Angol. The Spanish also established the forts of Arauco, Purén and Tucapel. The key areas of conflict that the Spanish attempted to secure south of Bío Bío River were the valleys around Cordillera de Nahuelbuta. The Spanish designs for this region were to exploit the placer deposits of gold using unpaid Mapuche labour from the densely populated valleys.

Following these initial conquests the Arauco War, a long period of intermittent war between Mapuches and Spaniards, broke out. A contributing factor was the lack of a tradition of forced labour like the Andean mit'a among the Mapuches who largely refused to serve the Spanish. On the other hand, the Spanish, in particular those from Castile and Extremadura, came from an extremely violent society.  Since the Spanish arrival in Araucanía in 1550, the Mapuches frequently laid siege to the Spanish cities in the 1550–1598 period. The war was mostly a low intensity conflict.

The Mapuches, led by Caupolicán and Lautaro, succeeded in killing Pedro de Valdivia at the Battle of Tucapel in 1553. The outbreak of a typhus plague, a drought and a famine prevented the Mapuches from taking further actions to expel the Spanish in 1554 and 1555. Between 1556 and 1557 a small party of Mapuches commanded by Lautaro attempted to reach Santiago to liberate the whole of Central Chile from Spanish rule. Lautaro's attempts ended in 1557 when he was killed in an ambush by the Spanish.

The Spanish regrouped under the governorship of García Hurtado de Mendoza (1558–1561) and managed to kill Caupolicán and Galvarino, two key Mapuche leaders. In addition during the rule of García Hurtado de Mendoza the Spanish reestablished Concepción and Angol that had been destroyed by Mapuches and founded two new cities in Mapuche territory: Osorno and Cañete. In 1567 Spaniards conquered Chiloé Archipelago which was inhabited by Huilliches.

In the 1570s Pedro de Villagra massacred and subdued revolting Mapuches around the city of La Imperial. Warfare in Araucanía intensified in the 1590s. Over time the Mapuche's of Purén and to a lesser extent also Tucapel gained a reputation of fierceness among Mapuches and Spaniards alike. This allowed the Purén Mapuches to rally other Mapuches in the war with the Spanish.

Adaptations to the war
In the early battles with the Spaniards Mapuches had little success but with time the Mapuches of Arauco and Tucapel adapted by using horses and amassing the large quantities of troops necessary to defeat the Spanish. Mapuches learned from the Spanish to build forts in hills; they also began digging traps for Spanish horses, using helmets and wooden shields against arquebuses. Mapuche warfare evolved toward guerrilla tactics including the use of ambushes. The killing of Pedro de Valdivia in 1553 marked a rupture with the earlier ritual warfare tradition of the Mapuches. 
Mapuche organization changed in response to the war and the aillarehue, a new macro-scale political unit consisting of several rehue, appeared in the late 16th century. This scaling-up of political organization continued until the early 17th century when the butalmapu emerged, each of these units made up of several aillarehues. At a practical level this meant that the Mapuches achieved a "supra-local level of military solidarity" without having state organization. By the late 16th century a handful of powerful Mapuche warlords had emerged near La Frontera.

Changes in population patterns
The Mapuche population decreased following contact with the Spanish invaders. Epidemics decimated much of the population as did the war with the Spanish. Others died in the Spanish gold mines. From archaeological evidence it has been suggested that the Mapuche of Purén and Lumaco valley abandoned the very scattered population pattern to form denser villages as a response to the war with the Spanish. Declining population meant that as agriculture diminished, many open fields in southern Chile were overgrown with forest.

By the 1630s it was noted by the Spanish of La Serena that Mapuches (Picunches) from the Corregimiento of Santiago, likely from Aconcagua Valley, had migrated north settling in the Combarbalá and Cogotí. This migration appears to have been done freely without Spanish interference.

In the late 16th century the indigenous Picunche began a slow process of assimilation by losing their indigenous identity. This happened by a process of mestization by gradually abandoning their villages (pueblo de indios) to settle in nearby Spanish haciendas. There Picunches mingled with disparate indigenous peoples brought in from Peru, Tucumán, Araucanía (Mapuche), Chiloé (Huilliche, Cunco, Chono, Poyas) and Cuyo (Huarpe).

Independence and war (1598–1641)

Fall of the Spanish cities

A watershed event happened in 1598. That year a party of warriors from Purén were returning south from a raid against the surroundings of Chillán. On their way back home they ambushed Martín García Óñez de Loyola and his troops who were sleeping without any night watch. It is not clear if they found the Spanish by accident or if they had followed them. The warriors, led by Pelantaro, killed both the governor and all his troops.

In the years following the Battle of Curalaba a general uprising developed among the Mapuches and Huilliches. The Spanish cities of Angol, La Imperial, Osorno, Santa Cruz de Oñez, Valdivia and Villarrica were either destroyed or abandoned. Only Chillán and Concepción resisted the Mapuche sieges and attacks. With the exception of Chiloé Archipelago all the Chilean territory south of Bío Bío River became free of Spanish rule.

Chiloé did however also suffer Mapuche (Huilliche) attacks when in 1600 local Huilliche joined the Dutch corsair Baltazar de Cordes to attack the Spanish settlement of Castro. While this was a sporadic attack, the Spanish believed the Dutch could attempt to ally the Mapuches and establish a stronghold in southern Chile. As the Spanish confirmed their suspicions of Dutch plans to establish themselves at the ruins of Valdivia they attempted to re-establish Spanish rule there before the Dutch arrived again. The Spanish attempts were thwarted in the 1630s when Mapuches did not allow the Spanish to pass by their territory.

Captured Spanish women
With the fall of the Spanish cities thousands of Spanish were either killed or turned into captives. Contemporary chronicler Alonso González de Nájera writes that Mapuches killed more than three thousand Spanish and took over 500 women as captives. Many children and Spanish clergy were also captured. Skilled artisans, renegade Spanish, and women were generally spared by the Mapuches. In the case of the women it was, in the words of González de Nájera, "to take advantage of them" (Spanish: aprovecharse de ellas). While some Spanish women were recovered in Spanish raids, others were only set free in agreements following the Parliament of Quillín in 1641. Some Spanish women became accustomed to Mapuche life and stayed voluntarily. Women in captivity gave birth to a large number of mestizos who were rejected by the Spanish but accepted among the Mapuches. These women's children may have had a significant demographic impact on Mapuche society, long ravaged by war and epidemics. The capture of women during the Destruction of the Seven Cities initiated a tradition of abductions of Spanish women in the 17th century by Mapuches.

Adoption of Old World crops, animals and technologies

Overall the Mapuche of Araucanía appear to have been very selective in adopting Spanish technologies and species. This meant that the Mapuche way of living remained largely the same after Spanish contact. The scant adoption of Spanish technology has been characterized as a means of cultural resistance.

Mapuches of Araucanía were quick to adopt the horse and wheat cultivation from the Spanish. In Chiloé Archipelago wheat came to be grown in lesser quantities compared to the native potatoes, given the adverse climate. Instead, on these islands the introduction of pigs and apple trees by the Spanish proved a success. Pigs benefited from abundant shellfish and algae exposed by the large tides.

Until the arrival of the Spanish the Mapuches had had chilihueque (llama) livestock. The introduction of sheep caused some competition among both domestic species. Anecdotal evidence of the mid-17th century show that both species coexisted but that there were many more sheep than chilihueques. The decline of chilihueques reached a point in the late 18th century when only the Mapuche from Mariquina and Huequén next to Angol raised the animal.

Gold mining became a tabu among Mapuches in colonial times, and gold mining often prohibited under death penalty.

Jesuit activity
The first Jesuits arrived in Chile in 1593 and based themselves in Concepción to Christianize the Araucanía Mapuches. Jesuit Father Luis de Valdivia believed Mapuches could be voluntarily converted to Christianity only if there was peace. He arranged the abolition of Mapuche servitude and the start of the so-called Defensive War with Spanish authorities. Luis de Valdivia took away warlord Anganamón's wives as the Catholic church opposed polygamy. Anganamón retaliated, killing three Jesuit missionaries on December 14, 1612. This incident did not stop the Jesuits' Christianization attempts and Jesuits continued their activity until their expulsion from Chile in 1767. Activity was centered around Spanish cities from which missionary excursions departed. No permanent mission was established in free Mapuche lands during the 17th or 18th century.  To convert the Mapuches Jesuits studied and learned their language and customs. Contrasting with their high political impact in the 1610s and 1620s, the Jesuits had little success in their conversion attempts.

Slavery of Mapuches

Formal slavery of indigenous people was prohibited by the Spanish Crown. The 1598–1604 Mapuche uprising that ended with the Destruction of the Seven Cities made the Spanish in 1608 declare slavery legal for those Mapuches caught in war. Rebelling Mapuches were considered Christian apostates and could therefore be enslaved according to the church teachings of the day. This legal change formalized Mapuche slavery that was already occurring at the time, with captured Mapuches being treated as property in the way they were bought and sold among the Spanish. Legalisation made Spanish slave raiding increasingly common in the Arauco War. Mapuche slaves were exported north to La Serena and Lima. Slavery for Mapuches "caught in war" was abolished in 1683 after decades of legal attempts by the Spanish Crown to suppress it. By that time free mestizo labour had become significantly cheaper than ownership of slaves, which made Mario Góngora conclude in 1966 that economic factors were behind the abolition.

Age of Parliaments (1641–1810)

Araucanization

Republican period (1810–1990)

Role in Chilean Independence War (1810–1821)
On October 24, 1811, Mapuche chiefs attended an invitation to Concepción by the junta that had recently assumed power. In Concepción the 400 Mapuche warriors that were invited were informed of the new political regime. Despite the Mapuches having likely a scant knowledge of the political upheavals in the Spanish Empire, the warriors declared their allegiance to the new regime.

In the Guerra a muerte (1819–1821) phase of the Chilean War of Independence, there was considerable infighting between different Mapuche factions as they supported either royalist or patriots. It is thought support for royalists or patriots may have been related to immediate benefits rather than ideological compromise. The long-running enmity between the lonkos Juan Lorenzo Colipí and Juan Magnil Hueno dates back to this period.

Coexistence with the Republic of Chile (1821–1861)
Mapuche lands south of Bío-Bío River began to be bought by non-Mapuches in the late 18th century, and by 1860 land between Bío-Bío and Malleco River was mostly under the control of Chileans. The Chilean wheat boom increased the pressure to acquire lands in Araucanía by Chileans and lead to numerous scams and fraud against Mapuches. A limited number of speculators obtained control over vast lands through fraud and maintained control over their assets with the help of gunmen.

The encroachment of settlers that had advanced over time from the north across Bío Bío River into Mapuche territory and the appearance of German settlers in southern Mapuche territory led chief Mañil in 1859 to call for an uprising to assert control over the territory. Most Mapuches responded to the call, except the communities at Purén, Choll Choll, and the southern coastal Mapuches who had strong links with Valdivia. The towns of Angol, Negrete and Nacimiento were attacked. A peace proposal made by settlers was accepted in 1860 during a meeting of several Mapuche chiefs. In the agreement it was established that land transfers could only be made with the approval of the chiefs.

End of Mapuche independence (1861–1883)

In the 19th century Chile experienced a fast territorial expansion. Chile established a colony at the Strait of Magellan in 1843, settled Valdivia, Osorno and Llanquihue with German immigrants and conquered land from Peru and Bolivia. Later Chile would also annex Easter Island. In this context Araucanía began to be conquered by Chile due to two reasons. First, the Chilean state aimed for territorial continuity and second, it remained the sole place for Chilean agriculture to expand.

Between 1861 and 1871 Chile incorporated several Mapuche territories in Araucanía. In January 1881, having decisively defeated Peru in the battles of Chorrillos and Miraflores, Chile resumed the conquest of Araucanía.

The campaigns of the Argentine Army against Mapuches in the other side of the Andes pushed in 1880 many Mapuches into Araucanía. Pehuenche chief Purrán was taken prisoner by the Argentine Army; the Argentine Army penetrated the valley of Lonquimay, which Chile considered part of its legal territory. The fast Argentine advance alarmed Chilean authorities and contributed to the Chilean-Mapuche confrontations of 1881.

On January 1 of 1883 Chile refounded the old city of Villarrica ending thus formally the process of occupation of Araucanía.

From dispossession to vindication (1883–1990)
Historian Ward Churchill has claimed that the Mapuche population dropped from a total of half a million to 25,000 within a generation as result of the occupation. The conquest of Araucanía caused numerous Mapuches to be displaced and forced to roam in search of shelter and food. Some Chilean forts responded by providing food rations. Until around 1900 the Chilean state provided almost 10,000 food rations monthly to displaced Mapuches. Mapuche poverty was a common theme in many Chilean Army memoirs from the 1880s to around 1900. Scholar Pablo Miramán states that the introduction of state education during the Occupation of Araucanía had detrimental effects on traditional Mapuche education.

In the years following the occupation the economy of Araucanía changed from being based on sheep and cattle herding to one based on agriculture and wood extraction. The loss of land by the Mapuches following the occupation caused severe erosion since they continued to practice significant livestock herding in limited areas.

Recent history (1990–present)

Many ethnic Mapuche now live across southern Chile and Argentina; some maintain their traditions and continue living from agriculture, but a majority have migrated to cities in search of better economic opportunities. Many are concentrated around Santiago. Chile's Araucanía Region, the former Araucanía, has a rural population that is 80% Mapuche; substantial Mapuche populations occupy areas of the regions of Los Lagos, Bío-Bío, and Maule.

In the 2002 Chilean census 604,349 people identified as Mapuche, and of these the two regions with the largest numbers were Araucanía with 203,221, and Santiago Metropolitan Region with 182,963. Each major population is greater than the total Mapuche population in Argentina as of 2004–2005.

In recent years, the Chilean government has tried to redress some of the inequities of the past.  In 1993 the Parliament passed Law n° 19 253 (Indigenous Law, or ), which officially recognized the Mapuche people and seven other ethnic minorities as well as the Mapudungun language and culture.  Mapundungun, whose use was prohibited before, is now included in the curriculum of elementary schools around Temuco.

Despite representing 4.6% of the Chilean population, few Mapuche have reached government positions.  In 2006 among Chile's 38 senators and 120 deputies, only one identified as indigenous. The number of indigenous politicians in electoral office is higher at municipal levels.

Representatives from Mapuche organizations have joined the Unrepresented Nations and Peoples Organisation (UNPO), seeking recognition and protection for their cultural and land rights.

Modern conflict 

Land disputes and violent confrontations continue in some Mapuche areas, particularly in the northern sections of the Araucanía region between and around Traiguén and Lumaco. In an effort to defuse tensions, the Commission for Historical Truth and New Treatments issued a report in 2003 calling for drastic changes in Chile's treatment of its indigenous people, more than 80 percent of whom are Mapuche. The recommendations included the formal recognition of political and "territorial" rights for indigenous peoples, as well as efforts to promote their cultural identities.
Though Japanese and Swiss interests are active in the economy of Araucanía, the two chief forestry companies are Chilean-owned. In the past, the firms have planted hundreds of thousands of acres with non-native species such as Monterey pine, Douglas firs and eucalyptus trees, sometimes replacing native Valdivian forests, although such substitution and replacement is now forbidden.

Chile exports wood to the United States, almost all of which comes from this southern region, with an annual value of $600 million and rising. Forest Ethics (now Stand.earth), a conservation group, has led an international campaign for preservation, resulting in the Home Depot chain and other leading wood importers agreeing to revise their purchasing policies to "provide for the protection of native forests in Chile." Some Mapuche leaders want stronger protections for the forests.

In recent years, the delicts committed by Mapuche activists have been prosecuted under counter-terrorism legislation, originally introduced by the military dictatorship of Augusto Pinochet to control political dissidents. The law allows prosecutors to withhold evidence from the defense for up to six months and to conceal the identity of witnesses, who may give evidence in court behind screens. Violent activist groups, such as the Coordinadora Arauco Malleco, use tactics such as the burning of structures and pastures and death threats against people and their families. Protesters from Mapuche communities have used these tactics against properties of both multinational forestry corporations and private individuals. In 2010 the Mapuche launched a number of hunger strikes in attempts to effect change in the anti-terrorism legislation.

Notes

References

Bibliography